

Results
Arsenal's score comes first

Football League Second Division

Final League table

FA Cup

References

1899-1900
English football clubs 1899–1900 season